Thomas Scott (c. 1563–1610), of Scot's Hall, Smeeth, Kent, was an English politician.

He married Elizabeth Honywood.

He was a Member (MP) of the Parliament of England for Aylesbury in 1586.

References

1560s births
1610 deaths
People from Smeeth
English MPs 1586–1587